Ganim was an Israeli settlement in the northern West Bank.

Ganim may also refer to:

Ganim (surname)
Be'er Ganim, a settlement in southern Israel
Ein Ganim, a former institution in Ottoman Palestine
Ir Ganim, a neighborhood in southwest Jerusalem
Maccabi Ein Ganim F.C., a former Israeli football club based in Petah Tikva